Salem Street Historic District is a national historic district located at Thomasville, Davidson County, North Carolina, United States. The district encompasses 33 contributing buildings in a predominantly residential section of Thomasville.  They were built between about 1861 and 1957, and include notable examples of Queen Anne and Colonial Revival style architecture. Notable buildings include the Heidelberg Church, St Paul's Episcopal Church, White House, Strickland-Long House, Morris-Harris House, and Leon A. Kress House.

It was added to the National Register of Historic Places in 2006.

References

Historic districts on the National Register of Historic Places in North Carolina
Queen Anne architecture in North Carolina
Colonial Revival architecture in North Carolina
Buildings and structures in Davidson County, North Carolina
National Register of Historic Places in Davidson County, North Carolina
Thomasville, North Carolina